is a railway station in the city of Handa, Aichi Prefecture, Japan, operated by Central Japan Railway Company (JR Tōkai).

Lines
Kamezaki Station is served by the Taketoyo Line, and is located 10.2 kilometers from the starting point of the line at Ōbu Station.

Station layout
The station  has two opposed side platforms connected to the station building by a footbridge. The station has automated ticket machines, TOICA automated turnstiles and is unattended.

Platforms

Adjacent stations

|-
!colspan=5|Central Japan Railway Company

Station history
Kamezaki Station was opened on March 1, 1886, as a passenger and freight station on the Japanese Government Railways (JGR). The JGR became the Japan National Railway (JNR) after World War II. Freight operations were discontinued from November 15, 1975. With the privatization and dissolution of the JNR on April 1, 1987, the station came under the control of the  Central Japan Railway Company. Automatic turnstiles were installed in May 1992, and the TOICA system of magnetic fare cards was implemented in November 2006. The station building, dating from 1886 and rebuilt after a fire in 1895, is one of the oldest in Japan.

Station numbering was introduced to the Taketoyo Line in March 2018; Kamezaki Station was assigned station number CE05.

Passenger statistics
In fiscal 2018, the station was used by an average of 2739 passengers daily (boarding passengers only).

Surrounding area
Kamezaki Elementary School
Kamezaki Junior High School

See also
 List of Railway Stations in Japan

References

External links

Railway stations in Japan opened in 1886
Railway stations in Aichi Prefecture
Taketoyo Line
Stations of Central Japan Railway Company
Handa, Aichi